Jorge Llambí (born 7 March 1939) is an Argentine equestrian. He competed in two events at the 1972 Summer Olympics.

References

1939 births
Living people
Argentine male equestrians
Olympic equestrians of Argentina
Equestrians at the 1972 Summer Olympics
Pan American Games medalists in equestrian
Pan American Games silver medalists for Argentina
Equestrians at the 1971 Pan American Games
Place of birth missing (living people)
Medalists at the 1971 Pan American Games